Karl Ichiro Akiya (1909–2001) was a Japanese-American writer and activist for numerous political and social causes. A labor activist in both the United States and Japan, Akiya was also an intellectual figure in the Japanese-American community.

Biography
Born in 1909 in San Francisco, California, Akiya spent the early years of his life in Japan, where he was first sent to receive an education at the age of six. Politically conscious since his student years, the staunchly leftist Akiya immigrated to the United States out of opposition to Japanese militarism in the decades preceding World War II.  During World War II, following the signing of Executive Order 9066, he was incarcerated at Topaz War Relocation Center in Utah.

A member of the Japanese American Citizens League, the Communist Party USA, and the United Furniture Workers of America, Akiya wrote for a variety of both American and Japanese periodicals and contributed to the Hokubei Shimpo, a Japanese-language newspaper in the United States. His essays, fiction, and an autobiography were published in The New York Bungei, a Japanese-language magazine Akiya helped found in 1959.
In 1987, Akya received the Martin Luther King Award of New York State.

References

External links 
Karl Ichiro Akiya Papers, Tamiment Library and Robert F. Wagner Labor Archives at New York University Special Collections

1909 births
2001 deaths
Japanese activists
Japanese-American civil rights activists
American writers of Japanese descent
American autobiographers
Japanese-American internees
Members of the Communist Party USA
Writers from San Francisco
Activists from California